Suraj Bhan DAV Public School is a private high school in Vasant Vihar, New Delhi, Delhi, India. It was established in 1984 and is part of the DAV College Managing Committee. It is affiliated to the Central Board of Secondary Education.

History 
The school was established in 1984 with eight classes. Subsequently it has expanded to a full 12-year school .There is a wonderful environment which helps child to gain maximum information .

Premises 
The school occupies an 85-room three storey building on a site that extends to 2.61 acres. Sports facilities include a basketball court, skating ring, playing area, and table tennis area.

See also
Education in India
List of schools in India
List of schools in Delhi affiliated with CBSE

References

External links 
 
 Central Board of Secondary Education

New Delhi
Private schools in Delhi
High schools and secondary schools in Delhi
Educational institutions established in 1984
1984 establishments in Delhi